is a passenger railway station in the city of Hanyū, Saitama, Japan, operated by the private railway operator Tōbu Railway.

Lines

Station layout
This station has two opposed side platforms connected by a footbridge.

Platforms

Adjacent stations

History

It closed 15 August 1908, and reopened on 1 April 1927. It was renamed Minami-Hanyū Station on 1 September 1968.

From 17 March 2012, station numbering was introduced on all Tōbu lines, with Minami-Hanyū Station becoming "TI-06".

Passenger statistics
In fiscal 2019, the station was used by an average of 3793 passengers daily (boarding passengers only).

Surrounding area
 Hanyū-Tekoba Post Office
 
 Tekoba Elementary School

See also
 List of railway stations in Japan

References

External links

 Minami-Hanyū Station information (Tobu) 

Tobu Isesaki Line
Stations of Tobu Railway
Railway stations in Saitama Prefecture
Railway stations in Japan opened in 1903
Hanyū, Saitama